Comedy Inc. may refer to:

Comedy Inc. (Australian TV series)
Comedy Inc. (Canadian TV series)